Francisco Javier Mendiburu Urgell (born December 1, 1980) is a Spanish basketball player, playing the point guard or the shooting guard position.

Honors 
Clubs Honors
LEB2 Champion - 2000/2001

Career statistics
 Correct as of 12 July 2007

External links 
 ACB Profile 

1980 births
Living people
Liga ACB players
CB Estudiantes players
Green Bay Phoenix men's basketball players
Indian Hills Warriors basketball players
Menorca Bàsquet players
Spanish men's basketball players
CB Tarragona players
Guards (basketball)
People from Badalona
Sportspeople from the Province of Barcelona
Basketball players from Catalonia